Middlewich, a town in northwest England, lies on the confluence of three rivers – the Dane, the Croco and the Wheelock. Most importantly for the history of salt making, it also lies on the site of a prehistoric brine spring.

Following the Roman invasion, Middlewich was named Salinae on account of the salt deposits around it, as it was one of their major sites of salt production. During this time the Romans built a fort at 
Harbutts Field (SJ70216696), to the north of the town.
 
 Recent excavations to the south of the fort have found evidence of further Roman activity

including a well and part of a preserved Roman road.

Salt manufacture has remained the principal industry for the past 2,000 years. Salt making is mentioned in the Domesday book, and by the 13th century there were approximately 100 "wich houses" packed around the town's two brine pits. By 1908 there were nine industrial scale salt manufacturers in the town, with a number of open pan salt works close to the canal, however salt manufacture in Middlewich is now concentrated in one manufacturer, British Salt. The salt is sold as the Saxa brand by RHM, and by others e.g. supermarket own brands. Salt produced by British Salt in Middlewich has 57% of the UK market for salt used in cooking.

Historical extracts concerning salt production in Middlewich

Camden's "Magna Brittania", 1580
"From thence runneth Wever down by Nantwich, not far from Middlewich, and so to Northwich.  These are very famous Salt-Witches, five or six miles distant, where brine or salt water is drawn out of pits, which they pour not upon wood while it burneth as the ancient Gauls and Germans were wont to do, but boil it over a fire to make salt thereof.  Neither doubt I that these were known unto the Romans, and that from hence was usually paid the Custom of Salt, called Salarium.

"For, there went a notable highway from Middlewich to Northwich, raised with gravel to such a height, that a man may easily acknowledge that it was the work of the Romans, seeing that all this country over, gravel is so scare: and from then at this day it is carried to private men’s uses. Mather Paris writeth that Henry III stopped up these salt-pits when in hostile manner he wasted this shire; because the Welshmen, so tumultuous in those days should not have any victuals or provisions from thence. But when the fair beams of peace began once more to shine out, they were opened again.

"Then runneth the Dane under Kinderton, the old seat of the ancient race of the Venebles; who, ever since the first coming of the Normans have been commonly called the Barons of Kinderton. Beneath this southwards, the little river croco, runnerth also into the Dan...Croke, the river aforesaid being past Brereton, within a little while visiteth Middlewich, very near unto his confluence with Dan, where there be two wells of salt water, parted one from the other by a small brook: Sheathes they call them. The one stands not open, but at certain set times, because folk willingly steal the water thereof, as being of greater virtue and efficacy. From thence runneth Dan to Bostoke, in time past Botestock, the ancient sear of the family of the Bostokes, Knights. Out of this ancient house of the Bostoks, as out of a stock, sprung a goodly number of the same name, in Cheshire, Shropshire, Berkshire and elsewhere."

Longitudinal study of salt sites in Middlewich

Croxton Works

The Croxton Works were located on the Trent and Mersey canal, approximately halfway between the Big Lock and the Croxton Lane Bridge at SJ699669. The works were established by the Dairy and Domestic Salt Company, probably in 1892. It was taken over by Henry Seddon before 1905 and worked until closed by subsidence in the 1920s. Until the early 1990s a derelict canal side warehouse still existed on the site, however this has now been demolished. All that remains now is a canal side flash (proposed as the site of a Middlewich Marina in the 1970s) and the foundations for the warehouse. Both the flash and warehouse foundations are now overgrown and hardly visible.

Kinderton Salt Works

It is likely that this is the only saltworks next to the Roman fort on Harbutt's field.  
Salt making sites in Cheshire
places this site at SJ703668, however the  
1882 Ordnance Survey map places the salt pans at approximately 
SJ7032266605, whilst Middlewich 900–1900 mentions the salt workings being yards away from the stone houses off King Street (i.e. the location given in the 1882 OS map). 
It is likely that this was the salt works of the Baron of Kinderton, Peter Venables, in 1671, and it is listed in documents of 1682 as producing a weekly output of 2,210 bushels of salt from its seven pans. By the mid-eighteenth century this was the only saltworks on the Kinderton side of the River Croco.   In the mid nineteenth century Ralph Seddon owned the works, and on his death it was sold to the Salt Union in 1888. Sometime between 1888 and 1919 the site was dismantled, however a capped off shaft which once formed part of the works could be seen from the path running from King Street to the Big Lock until the new housing estate was built.

Pepper Street Salt Works

In around 1913 the Pepper Street salt works were rebuilt by Henry Seddon. Following a merger between Seddon and Sons and Cerebos in the late 1950s, the open pans at Pepper Street and those at the Cerebos site on Booth Lane were worked together as a single department, before being closed in 1968–1970. The Pepper Street works were demolished in the mid 1970s (at around the same time as the gas works on the opposite side of the canal), and the site is now a housing estate.

Wych House Lane Salt Works
In the 14th century the area around the current Wych House Lane was occupied by many salt houses. In 1892 a new salt works was established to the north of Wych House Lane, owned by the Dairy and Domestic Company. In common with many of the works this was taken over by Henry Seddon in the early 1900s. The works continued to be used until around 1969, and were used by the town council as a depot until the 1980s. The land is currently a green field running down to the canal.

Chesworth’s/Newtons Salt Works
Salt making sites in Cheshire locates Newtons Salt Works at the same site as Wych House Lane Salt works (SJ705662). However the 1898 map places Newtons Salt Works to the south side of Wych House Lane, at approximately SJ706661.

Aman's Salt Works

Aman's Salt Works was opened on Brooks Lane shortly after the discovery in 1889 of rock salt and brine at the adjacent Murgatroyd's site, with the earliest entry in the accounts book being 16 November 1892. The location of Aman's Works, between the Trent and Mersey canal and the railway branch line between Sandbach and Northwich, is indicative of the move from canals to railways for transport during the nineteenth century. To this end the works had its own siding and platform for loading trains adjacent to the branch line (around 300 metres from Middlewich railway station).

Murgatroyd's Salt works

Brunner Mond Salt Works – Brooks Lane

British Salt

The only remaining salt works in Middlewich is the British Salt works at Cledford (SJ716644). This salt works obtains its brine from Warmingham nearby, rather than Middlewich. Salt from this works is sold by RHM under the Saxa brand.

Regeneration
All of the old town centre salt works are now closed. Because of the aggressive chemicals that were handled, salt houses were 'temporary' structures, and so unlike the mills constructed in the mill towns of Lancashire, they would be unsuitable for conversion into other uses. Consequently, almost all the structures of the old salt works have been pulled down and the land has been put to other uses.

See also

History of salt
Salt in Cheshire
Open pan salt making
Weaver Hall Museum and Workhouse, Northwich

References

External links
Salt making sites in Cheshire, George Twigg
Salt Manufacturers Association: history of salt
History of the Murgatroyd's salt works

Chemical industry in the United Kingdom
Economy of Cheshire
Middlewich
Middlewich
Salt